The Limbășel is a right tributary of the river Azuga in Romania. Its source is in the Baiu Mountains, near Predeal. It flows into the Azuga east of the town Azuga.

References

Rivers of Romania
Rivers of Prahova County